Bogucino  (German: Bogenthin) is a village in the administrative district of Gmina Kołobrzeg, within Kołobrzeg County, West Pomeranian Voivodeship, in north-western Poland.

See also
History of Pomerania

References

Bogucino